Wiloma is a historic home near Fincastle, Botetourt County, Virginia. It was built in 1848, and is a two-story, brick I-house dwelling with Greek Revival style detailing. It has a two-level pedimented porch on the south and a long two-story wing with a two-level porch completed in 1888.

It was listed on the National Register of Historic Places in 1985.

References

Houses on the National Register of Historic Places in Virginia
Greek Revival houses in Virginia
Houses completed in 1848
Houses in Botetourt County, Virginia
National Register of Historic Places in Botetourt County, Virginia
1848 establishments in Virginia